Rodolfo Gonzaga (18 April 1452, in Mantua – 6 July 1495, in Fornovo) was an Italian condottiero. He was the son of Ludovico III Gonzaga and Barbara of Brandenburg. He had married Caterina Pico and he was the founder of the Castel Goffredo, Castiglione and Solferino cadet branch of the House of Gonzaga. He died at the Battle of Fornovo, where he commanded a contingent of men fighting against France.

15th-century condottieri
Rodolfo
1452 births
1495 deaths